Casazza is a station of the Brescia Metro, in the city of Brescia in northern Italy. The station is located beside Centro Futura, a large mixed-use development, on the west side of Via Triumplina at the intersection with Via Conicchio. Construction of the station by cut and cover required the complete rehabilitation of Via Triumplina, with five triangular skylights on the surface being the only outward sign of a much more complex underground structure.

References

External links

Futura Suite 

Brescia Metro stations
Railway stations opened in 2013
2013 establishments in Italy
Railway stations in Italy opened in the 21st century